NA-108 Jhang-I is a constituency for the National Assembly of Pakistan. It is based on the old NA-91 with the main difference being the transfer of the city of Ahmedpur Sial to the new NA-116.

Members of Parliament

2018-2022: NA-114 Jhang-I

Election 2002

General elections were held on 10 Oct 2002. Muhammad Mehboob Sultan of PML-Q won by 53,545 votes.

Election 2008

General elections were held on 18 Feb 2008. Muhammad Mehboob Sultan of PML-Q won by 75,803 votes.

Election 2013

General elections were held on 11 May 2013. Najaf Abbas Khan Sial of PML-N won by 91,301 votes and became the  member of National Assembly.

Election 2018 
General elections were held on 25 July 2018.

See also
NA-107 Toba Tek Singh-III
NA-109 Jhang-II

References

External links
Election result's official website

NA-091